Cayman Vanguard Party a political party in the Cayman Islands. CVP was founded in 1958 by William Warren Conolly and others. CVP was dissolved shortly afterwards. Connolly later became deputy president of the National Democratic Party.

Political parties in the Cayman Islands
Political parties established in 1958
1958 establishments in the Cayman Islands